Dinmukhamed Akhmetuly "Dimash" Kunaev (also spelled Kunayev; , ;  – 22 August 1993) was a Kazakh Soviet communist politician who served as the First Secretary of the Communist Party of Kazakhstan.

Early life

Origins 
His grandfather was Zhumabai (kaz. Jumabai) (–1912). His father, Minliakhmed (Akhmed) Zhumabaievich (kaz. Meŋlıahmed Jumabaiūly) (1886–1976), was literate, worked in agricultural and trade organizations of the Alma-Ata oblast and could write in both Russian and Kazakh well. His mother, Zaure Baiyrovna Kunaeva (née Shynbolatova (Chimbulatova)) (kaz. Zaure Baiypqyzy Qonaeva) (1888—1973), was born in a poor family in the Shelek aul, Almaty oblast. They lived together for 70 years. There are claims that Kunaev might possibly come from the oiyq branch of the Ysty tribe, Senior juz. In his "From Stalin to Gorbachev" book, he mentioned that his "ancestors comes from the Baidıbek, jigit of the Senior juz". According to the official biography, he is ethnically Kazakh and his ancestors were hunters, that lived on the coasts of Ili (river) and Kürtı rivers of the Balkhash District in the aul Bakanas. Kunaev, the son of a Kazakh clerk, was born at Verny, now Almaty, and grew up in a middle-income family.

Rise to power 

After finishing the Almaty №14th secondary school in 1930, he studied in the Institute of Non-Ferrous and Fine Metallurgy in Moscow in 1936, which enabled him to become a machine operator. By 1939 he had become engineer-in-chief of the Pribalkhashatroi mine, and joined the Communist Party of the Soviet Union (CPSU), a condition of the position.

Kunaev was deputy chairman of the Council of People's Commissars of the Kazakh SSR from April 1942 to 1946. In this post, during the years of World War II, he conducted significant work on the deployment and commissioning of enterprises and factories evacuated to Kazakhstan from the front-line areas of the USSR, as well as mobilising and training the republic's human reserves and soldiers for the Red Army. From 1946 to 1952, he was deputy chairman of the Council of Ministers of the Kazakh SSR. In 1952, he was elected President of the Academy of Sciences of the Kazakh SSR, which under his leadership conducted scientific research with the aim of developing and improving industry and agriculture, and the more efficient use of Kazakhstan's natural resources. He served in this post until 1955, when he became Chairman of the Council of Ministers of the Kazakh SSR.

Kunaev's rise in Communist Party ranks had been closely tied to that of Leonid Brezhnev's. In February 1954, Khrushchev appointed Panteleymon Ponomarenko as the first secretary of the Communist Party of Kazakhstan, and Leonid Brezhnev as the second secretary. Soon, Kunaev and Brezhnev developed a close friendship which lasted until the death of Brezhnev. 

Brezhnev soon became the first secretary of the Communist Party of Kazakhstan in 1955 and a member of CPSU Politburo in 1956. When Brezhnev left Kazakhstan in 1956, Ivan Iakovlev became the First Secretary of the Kazakh Communist Party (and was succeeded by Nikolai Belyaev). On 19 January 1960, Kunaev was elected 1st Secretary of the Communist Party of Kazakhstan.

First Secretary
As First Secretary, Kunaev was an ardent supporter of the Virgin Lands campaign, which opened millions of hectares of lands in central Kazakhstan to agricultural development and caused a large influx of Russian immigrants into Kazakhstan. However, in 1962 he was dismissed from his position as he disagreed with Khrushchev's plans to incorporate some lands in Southern Kazakhstan into Uzbekistan. Ismail Yusupov, a supporter of the plan, replaced Kunaev.

After his dismissal as First Secretary, he was Chairman of the Council of Ministers of the Kazakh SSR until 1964, when he became first secretary of the Central Committee of the Communist Party of Kazakhstan again in 1964 when Khrushchev was ousted and replaced by Brezhnev. He kept his position for twenty-two more years. He was an alternate member of the Politburo from 1967, and a full member from 1971 to 1987.

During Kunaev's long rule, Kazakhs occupied prominent positions in the bureaucracy, economy and educational institutions. In 1984, Kunaev made Nursultan Nazarbayev the Chairman of the Council of Ministers. However, at the sixteenth session of the Communist Party of Kazakhstan in January 1986, Nazarbayev criticized Askar Kunayev, President of the Academy of Sciences for not reforming his department. Dinmukhamed Kunayev, Nazarbayev's boss and Askar's brother, felt deeply angered and betrayed. Kunayev went to Moscow and demanded Nazarbayev's dismissal while Nazarbayev's supporters campaigned for Kunayev's dismissal and Nazarbayev's promotion.

However, this did not go well for Kunaev, who saw his brother dismissed as President of the Academy of Sciences (and succeeded by Murat Aitkhozhin), as well as seeing Nazarbaev keep his position as Chairman of the Council of Ministers. Soon D. A. Kunaev himself was dismissed, as he was removed from office under pressure from Mikhail Gorbachev, who accused him of corruption. On 16 December 1986 the Politburo replaced him with Gennady Kolbin, who had never lived in the Kazakh SSR before. The decision set off three days of street rioting in Almaty, between 16 and 18 December 1986 – which were the first signs of ethnic strife during Gorbachev's tenure. In modern Kazakhstan, this revolt is called Jeltoqsan (meaning December in Kazakh). 

In January 1987, D. A. Kunaev was removed from the Politburo of the Central Committee of the CPSU, and in June 1987 from the Central Committee of the CPSU.

After the resignation, he lived in his hometown of Alma-Ata. He died in the evening of 22 August 1993 in the village of Akshi, Alakol district of Almaty region as a result of a heart attack. He was buried on 25 August 1993 at the Kensai cemetery in the city of Alma-Ata.

Positions of power

Leadership Positions 

 Deputy chairman of the Council of People's Commissars of the Kazakh SSR (1942–46)
 Deputy chairman of the Council of Ministers of the Kazakh SSR (1946–52)
 President of the Academy of Sciences of the Kazakh SSR (1952–55)
 Chairman of the Council of Ministers of the Kazakh SSR (1955–60, 1962–64)
 1st Secretary of the Communist Party of Kazakhstan (1960–62, 1964–86)

Political Positions 

 Deputy of the Supreme Soviet of the Kazakh SSR of the 2nd–11th conventions (1947–89)
 Delegate to the XIX-XXVII Congresses of the CPSU (1952–1986)
 Deputy of the Supreme Soviet of the USSR of the 4th–11th conventions (1954–89)
 Member of the Central Committee of the CPSU (1956–87)
 Candidate-Member of the 23rd Politburo of the Central Committee of the CPSU (1966–71)
 Full Member of the 24th–27th Politburo of the Central Committee of the CPSU (1971–87)

Achievements 
Under D. A. Kunaev, a significant economic upswing in Kazakh SSR was achieved, the industrial potential of the republic increased significantly (mainly due to the mining, raw materials industries and the energy sector serving them) and agriculture (the annual famous “billion pounds” of grain was produced many times). In his book "From Stalin to Gorbachev" (1994), Kunaev himself referred to the data of the USSR State Statistics Committee, and he describes in detail his contribution to the development of living standards and the rise of the economy of the Kazakh SSR. By the end of Kunaev's time in power, compared with 1955, the economic potential of the Kazakh SSR increased by seven times, the standard of living, industry, production rose to a historic maximum, and the Kazakh SSR became the third largest economy in the Soviet Union (after the Russian SFSR and Ukrainian SSR). For great services to the development of the economy and the standard of living in the country, he was very popular among the Kazakh people and many still call the Kunaev era as the "Golden Age of Kazakhstan" to this day.

Awards

Soviet

Foreign

Legacy 
Kunaev spent the last years of his life in charitable activity, establishing the 'Dinmukhamed Kunaev Foundation', one of whose purposes was the support of political reform in Kazakhstan.

 In Almaty, a bust is installed in the square of his name. Also, his bust is in Taraz and in the village of Tortkol.
 Streets in a number of cities in Kazakhstan – in Almaty (Kunaev street), Taraz, Taldykorgan, Ekibastuz and the central street in the new administrative center of Astana.
 In Uralsk, a microdistrict is named after Kunaev.
 In Shymkent, a boulevard (former Alma-Ata Avenue and former Stepnaya Street) is named after D. A. Kunaev.
 The main street and the square of the city of Usharal is named after D. A. Kunaev. Also in the central square is a monument to D. A. Kunaev.
 The Eurasian Law Academy in Almaty is named after Kunaev.
 The Kunaev Home Museum (117 Tulebaev St.), opened in 2002 to the 90th anniversary of D. A. Kunaev.
 In Almaty, the Institute of Mining bears his name.
 As of March 2022, city Kapshagai is planned to be renamed after Kunaev.

 In May 2022, in the village of Bakanas, Almaty region of Kazakhstan, a monument to Kunaev was opened for the 110th anniversary.
 On May 20, 2022, a mural depicting statesman Dinmukhamed Kunaev appeared in Almaty. The author is Adilzhan Musa.
 On August 13, 2022, a monument to statesman Dinmukhamed Kunayev was unveiled in Taraz.
 In October 2022, a memorial was erected in Qonayev in honor of the 110th anniversary of Dinmukhamed Kunayev, the 100th anniversary of Asanbai Askarov, the 110th anniversary of Shapyk Shokin, who stood at the origins of the construction of the Kapshagay Hydroelectric Power Plant and the foundation of the city.

References

External links 

Kazakhstan: Seven Year Plan for Prosperity by Dinmukhamed Kunayev
Commemorative Coin – 100 years anniversary of Konayev's birth

1912 births
1993 deaths
Heroes of Socialist Labour
Party leaders of the Soviet Union
People from Almaty
People from Semirechye Oblast
Politburo of the Central Committee of the Communist Party of the Soviet Union members
First Secretaries of the Communist Party of Kazakhstan
Eleventh convocation members of the Soviet of the Union
Tenth convocation members of the Soviet of the Union
Ninth convocation members of the Soviet of the Union
Eighth convocation members of the Soviet of the Union
Seventh convocation members of the Soviet of the Union
Sixth convocation members of the Soviet of the Union
Fifth convocation members of the Soviet of Nationalities
Fourth convocation members of the Soviet of Nationalities
Recipients of the Order of Lenin
Recipients of the Order of Georgi Dimitrov
Recipients of the Order of the Red Banner of Labour
Recipients of the Medal "For Distinction in Guarding the State Border of the USSR"
Heads of government of the Kazakh Soviet Socialist Republic